The Afon Cothi is the largest tributary of the River Tywi in south Wales. It is noted for its trout and sea trout (sewin) fishing and for its scenery.

External links
 

Rivers of Carmarthenshire
Rivers of Ceredigion
River Towy